Grozdan Karadzhov (Bulgarian: Гроздан Караджов) is a Bulgarian politician and was a member of the 43rd national assembly. He was a deputy Prime Minister in the government of Kiril Petkov and the minister of regional development and public works.

Biography 
He was born 14 December 1966 in Stara Zagora. He graduated from the First English Language High School in Sofia and majored in Law at Sofia University. He specialised in business management in telecommunications when studying in Japan.

He was the chair of the Independent Student Society at the Faculty of Law at Sofia University in the 1990s. He was also a co-founder and national coordinator of the Bulgarian Association for Fair Elections. He was the program coordinator, general secretary and program director of the Open Society - Sofia.

In 1997 he became General Secretary of the Committee on Posts and Telecommunications. During Ivan Kostov's government he was Secretary General of the Ministry of Transport. Until 2004 he was a representative of the state in the management of BTC.

He was a member of the Supervisory Board of the Bulgarian Post Bank. After the fall of Ivan Kostov's cabinet, Karadjov took over the management of the Democracy Party Foundation until 2004.

In the parliamentary elections in 2014 he was elected a Member of Parliament in 43 National Assembly from the list of the Republic of Bulgaria in 24 MIR Sofia. Between 27 November 2014 and 9 December 2015, he chaired the Parliamentary Committee on Transport, Information Technology and Communications.

In August 2021 he was nominated for Minister of Transport, Information Technology and Communications in the failed cabinet with a mandate from the party "There is such a people" and Prime Minister Plamen Nikolov.

After the formation of the Petkov Government following the November 2021 Bulgarian Legislative Election, he was Minister of Regional Development and Public Works and deputy Prime Minister.

Karadzhov is married, with 4 kids.

References

Bulgarian politicians
1966 births
Living people